Nardia is a genus of parasitic flies in the family Tachinidae.

Species
Nardia rufolateralis (Crosskey, 1984)
Nardia tsavo Cerretti, 2009

References

Diptera of Africa
Dexiinae
Tachinidae genera